The 2017–18 SBL Cup was the 14th season of the SBL Cup, the league cup competition of the Swiss Basketball League (SBL). The competition was held from 13 December 2017 until 28 January 2018. Fribourg Olympic won its eighth league cup title.

Bracket

See also
2017–18 Swiss Basketball League

References

External links
SBL Website

BBL-Pokal seasons
BBL-Pokal